Erke Khongghor, alternatively known as Ejei ("Ejei" means "lord" in the Mongolian language), (?–1641) was the last khagan of the Northern Yuan dynasty, ruling briefly from 1634 to 1635. He was the son of Ligdan Khan. The Northern Yuan dynasty, which existed as remnants of the Yuan dynasty retreating north to the Mongolian Plateau after 1368, was defeated by the Later Jin dynasty in 1635 and thus formally came to an end.

History
By the early 17th century, the Borjigin clan had lost nearly all of its power. After his father died in 1634, Ejei and his mother were surrounded by over ten thousand Later Jin cavalry in a surprise attack in February 1635. Weighing their options, Ejei and his mother decided to surrender and was said to have given the imperial seal of the Yuan dynasty to Hong Taiji. In 1636, Hong Taiji, who inherited the title of Great Khan, formally proclaimed the Qing dynasty. Ejei then followed the Qing court's order to ask the remnants of the Mongols still resisting the Qing to lay down their arms and surrender, and he did so successfully. In March, 1636, all resistance ceased and Mongol chieftains from a total of sixteen clans and forty-nine subclans gathered at Mukden, gave their allegiance to Hong Taiji, officially marking the end of the rule of the Borjigin clan. For his contribution, Ejei was awarded the rank of Prince (Qin Wang, 親王), a title he held until his death in 1641, and inherited by his younger brother Abunai (阿布奈).

Abunai (阿布奈) openly showed his discontent toward the Qing dynasty and he was put under house arrest in Shenyang by the Kangxi Emperor in 1669 and his imperial title / rank was given to his son Borni (布尔尼) in September of that same year. Borni (布尔尼) was careful to not show any sign of disrespecting the Qing dynasty, but finally in 1675, he suddenly rebelled along with his younger brother Lubuzung (罗布藏), capitalizing on the Revolt of the Three Feudatories.  However, they had made a serious miscalculation in wrongfully believing that other Mongols would join them, when in reality only three thousand Chahar Mongols joined the rebellion. It only took a single decisive battle on April 20, 1675 to defeat Abunai (阿布奈) and his followers, who were all killed subsequently in their retreat. The Qing dynasty's punishment of the rebellion was very harsh: all royal males of Chahars were executed, including infants born to Qing princesses, and all royal females of Chahars were sold to slavery except these Qing princesses.

References

See also
 List of khans of the Northern Yuan dynasty
 Draft History of Qing

Northern Yuan rulers
17th-century Mongol rulers
17th-century Chinese monarchs
1641 deaths
Year of birth unknown